Carl Gustaf Lindström (1779-1855), was a Swedish opera singer (tenor).  He was an elite member of the Royal Swedish Opera in 1800-1844, and a Hovsångare.  He was described as a tenor with great range of voice and a pleasing appearance and was counted among the most valuable members of the opera for about forty years.  He was married to Elise Frösslind.

References 

 Lindström, Carl Gustaf i Herman Hofberg, Svenskt biografiskt handlexikon (andra upplagan, 1906)

1779 births
1855 deaths
19th-century Swedish opera singers